The 2019–20 Moldovan National Division season, is the 29th season of the top basketball league in Moldova.

Competition format
Six teams joined the regular season, played as a double-legged round-robin tournament. The four best qualified teams joined the playoffs, that would be played in a best-of-five format.

Teams

Regular season

League table

Results

References

External links
Moldovan Basketball Federation
Moldovan league on Eurobasket

Moldovan
Basketball in Moldova